Tomás Romañach (1890 - death date unknown) was a Cuban baseball shortstop in the Cuban League and Negro leagues. He played from 1908 to 1916 with several clubs, including Almendares, Habana, the Long Branch Cubans, and the Cuban Stars (East). Romañach was nicknamed "El Italiano". He was elected to the Cuban Baseball Hall of Fame in 1948.

References

External links

Year of death missing
Cuban League players
Almendares (baseball) players
Habana players
Long Branch Cubans players
Orientals players
Cuban baseball players
1890 births